Staying Alive is a British television medical drama series written and created by Neil McKay, first broadcast on ITV on 1 November 1996. The series, which follows a group of student nurses working in a London hospital, starred Jessica Hynes, Amanda Royle and Susannah Wise in the title roles, alongside Paul Higgins, Sophie Okonedo, Jenny Bolt, Sean Blowers and Ayub Khan-Din. Co-produced and partially filmed in London, Staying Alive was one of the first ITV dramas to be co-produced between LWT and an international production company.

Across two series, a total of twelve episodes were broadcast. Episodes were broadcast at 9:00pm on Fridays as part of LWT's new-look slate of British drama. For the second series, a number of new regular cast members were introduced, including Ian Fitzgibbon, Susan McArdle and Rupert Procter. In 1996, a docudrama series with the same name aired on Channel 4, following the lives of six people from different countries around the world infected by the HIV virus. Subsequently, there was some confusion as several TV listings magazines confused the two programmes in the listings guide. Notably, the series has never been released on VHS or DVD.

Cast
 Jessica Hynes as Alice Timpson
 Amanda Royle as Dr. Sue McPherson
 Susannah Wise as Dr. Michaela Lennox
 Paul Higgins as Alan McPherson
 Sophie Okonedo as Kelly Booth 
 Jenny Bolt as Cassandra Naylor
 Sean Blowers as Sgt. Gordon Naylor (Series 1)
 Ayub Khan-Din as Dr. Suni Rai
 Tom Beard as Dr. Miles Vincent
 Lynne Verrall as Sister Felicity O'Keefe
 Lesley Nicol as Sister Kate Worswick
 Liz Kettle as Sister Fran Coulson
 Caroline Hunnisett as Sister Annette Ayers (Series 1)
 Yonic Blackwood as Staff Nurse Brigid Watters (Series 1)
 Karl Draper as Christopher Morrison
 Scott Ransome as Philip Curtis (Series 1)
 Charlotte Emmerson as Helen Curtis (Series 1)
 Ian Fitzgibbon as Martin Roebuck (Series 2)
 Susan McArdle as Nikki Salvani (Series 2)
 Rupert Procter as Danny Collins (Series 2)
 Claudette Barnard as Margaret Timpson
 Heather Tobias as Barbara Dawlish (Series 1)

Episodes

Series 1 (1996)

Series 2 (1997)

References

External links

1996 British television series debuts
1997 British television series endings
1990s British drama television series
1990s British medical television series
ITV television dramas
English-language television shows
Television series by ITV Studios
London Weekend Television shows
Television shows set in London